Pedro Miguel Almeida Lopes Pereira (born 22 January 1998) is a Portuguese professional footballer who plays as a right-back for Süper Lig club Alanyaspor, on loan from Monza.

Early life
Born in Vendas Novas, Évora District, Pereira grew up supporting Sporting CP but switched allegiances to city rivals Benfica upon joining them as a youth.

Club career

Sampdoria 
Pereira transferred to Italian club Sampdoria in 2015, and made his professional Serie A debut on 14 September that year, as a 22nd-minute substitute for Mattia Cassani in a 2–0 home win over Bologna. On 4 October, he registered his first assist in a 1–1 draw with Inter Milan, also at the Stadio Luigi Ferraris, for Luis Muriel to open the scoring.

Benfica

First team 
On 30 January 2017, Pereira returned to Benfica and signed a contract until 2022. He made his only first-team appearance for the Encarnados on 20 May in the last game for the already crowned champions, playing the full 90 minutes of a 2–2 draw at Boavista FC, and thereby being recorded as a league winner.

Reserve team 
Pereira's only other involvement with the club was on 28 October, in the reserve team's 4–0 loss at Gil Vicente FC, on the request of club president Luís Filipe Vieira to motivate the player who was out of first-team coach Rui Vitória's plans.

Genoa (loan) 
In January 2018, Pereira was loaned back to Serie A, to Sampdoria's city rivals Genoa on an 18-month deal. The Rossoblu were given the option to purchase him for €4.5 million.

Bristol City (loan) 
Pereira was loaned again in August 2019, to Bristol City of England's EFL Championship for a year with the option to buy for €6 million. He scored his first senior goal on 27 October, an 86th-minute equaliser in the Robins' 2–2 home draw with Wigan Athletic, heading in a corner kick from Niclas Eliasson at the near post.

Crotone (loan) 
On 21 September 2020, Pereira was loaned back to Serie A, this time to Crotone.

Monza 
On 23 July 2021, Pereira joined Serie B side Monza on a one-year loan, with a conditional obligation to buy for €2.5 million. By 31 December 2021, Benfica had sold the player's rights to Monza. Pereira began the season by assisting Carlos Augusto's goal against Cittadella in the first round of the 2021–22 Coppa Italia on 14 August 2021; the match ended in a 2–1 defeat. On 29 August, Pereira assisted Christian Gytkjær in a 1–0 home win against Cremonese.

Alanyaspor (loan) 
On 18 August 2022, Monza loaned out Pereira to Turkish Süper Lig club Alanyaspor for one year.

Career statistics

Honours
Benfica
 Primeira Liga: 2016–17

Portugal U21
 UEFA European Under-21 Championship runner-up: 2021

References

External links

 

1998 births
Living people
Sportspeople from Évora District
Portuguese footballers
Association football fullbacks
Sporting CP footballers
S.L. Benfica footballers
U.C. Sampdoria players
S.L. Benfica B players
Genoa C.F.C. players
Bristol City F.C. players
F.C. Crotone players
A.C. Monza players
Alanyaspor footballers
Serie A players
Primeira Liga players
Liga Portugal 2 players
English Football League players
Serie B players
Süper Lig players
Portugal youth international footballers
Portugal under-21 international footballers
Portuguese expatriate footballers
Portuguese expatriate sportspeople in Italy
Expatriate footballers in Italy
Portuguese expatriate sportspeople in England
Expatriate footballers in England
Portuguese expatriate sportspeople in Turkey
Expatriate footballers in Turkey